Tony Petelos is an Alabama politician, having served as a state legislator, the mayor of Hoover, Alabama, and the county manager for Jefferson County.

Political career
A Republican, Petelos served in the Alabama House of Representatives from 1986 to 1997. After his career in the legislature, he served as the state's Commissioner of the Department of Human Resources after his appointment by Governor Fob James in 1997.

Petelos was mayor of Hoover, Alabama. He was elected to the office in September 2004.

Petelos was selected by the county commission to serve as commissioner of Jefferson County in September 2011.

He sat on the human resources state board, having been appointed by Governor Bob Riley.

Personal life
Petelos grew up in Birmingham's Ensley neighborhood.

He is married to the former Teresa Bearden, a circuit judge in neighboring Bessemer. They met while both were students at the University of Alabama at Birmingham.

References

1953 births
Living people
Mayors of places in Alabama
Republican Party members of the Alabama House of Representatives
People from Hoover, Alabama
University of Alabama at Birmingham alumni
People from Ensley, Alabama